Dos Angeles (stylized as DOS ANGELES) is Japanese-American recording artist Joe Inoue's second full-length album, originally released as a standard and limited edition release on October 6, 2010. It peaked at 136 on the Oricon Weekly Album Charts, remaining on the charts for only one week.

The title of the album is a reference to Inoue's home town of Los Angeles, California, as well as symbolizing that it is his second album ("Dos" being the Spanish word for "two").

Track listing
All songs are written, composed, and performed by Joe Inoue.
 "Can you hear me?" – 1:27
  – 3:40
 "Home" – 3:58
  – 4:44
 "Animal feat. Yoko Yazawa" – 4:16
  – 3:27
 "Lights (Album ver.)" – 4:04
 "Go! (Album ver.)" – 3:39
 "Closer (English ver.)" – 3:29
  – 2:21

Limited edition DVD
"Kaze no Gotoku" (Music Video)
"Go!" (Music Video)
"Home" (Music Video)
"Valentine's Day Special Acoustic Live"
Making of "Home"

References

External links
 Joe Inoue's official website  

2010 albums
Joe Inoue albums